Rod, Jane and Freddy were a singing trio who appeared in children's programming on the British TV channel ITV in the 1970s, 1980s and early 1990s.  They starred both in the long-running series Rainbow and their own 15-minute show. The trio have also made guest appearances in other children's TV shows, including The Sooty Show.

The original trio consisted of Rod Burton, Jane Tucker and Matthew Corbett, when they were known as "Rod, Matt and Jane". Matthew left the trio in 1976 to continue hosting The Sooty Show after his father retired. Matthew was replaced by actor Roger Walker, whereupon the trio became known as "Rod, Jane and Roger". When Walker left in 1980 to continue his career in acting he was replaced by Freddy Marks, leading to the best-remembered incarnation of the trio.

During their three decades working on children's television they managed to write over 2,500 songs on various themes using many different music styles. Most were comedic but others had deeper meanings. Overall they have written and produced 10 albums and 24 videos, and have conceived and performed jingles for commercial radio, theme and title music for TV, and songs for pantomimes.

Rod, Jane and Freddy

Due to their popularity on Rainbow, Rod, Jane and Freddy were approached by ITV in 1980 to make their own show, Rod, Jane and Freddy, which aired its first episode on 15 January 1981.  Rod, Jane and Freddy appeared in both their own show and Rainbow until 1989, when they left their position as musicians on Rainbow to focus solely on their own series.

Their show often followed a certain format:

 Opening with a big song, giving an idea of the particular show's topic (music and song, pets, moving house, etc.)
 Rod, Jane and Freddy would usually have solo songs
 There was often a sketch, but these were generally rarer than songs
 They would close with a final song
 As the credits rolled, the first or last song would be sung again.

Episode list
The following is a list of episodes. Fremantle archive episode list use master tape titles where available, if unavailable they use the episode titles as they appeared in TV guides.

Many episodes from 1981 to 1982 no longer exist due to the then British TV policy of wiping.

Touring
Rod, Jane and Freddy toured the UK until 1996; their stage show followed the same format and the 15-minute ITV show, filled with songs, dancing, mime and comedy. In 1996 they won a Gold Badge Award from The British Academy of Composers and Songwriters.

Videos
The trio released a number of videos in the late 80s and early 90s. These include:

Present-day
Following the end of the Rod, Jane and Freddy Show, the trio no longer regularly appeared on television, instead appearing in British children's theatre and pantomime. The trio also appeared in Peter Kay's video for his 2007 Comic Relief release of I'm Gonna Be (500 Miles).

In June 2008 Rod, Jane and Freddy appeared on the show 50 Ways to Leave Your TV Lover on Sky and talked about newspaper claims that they were involved in a love triangle. They explained that Rod and Jane had been married then divorced.  Jane partnered with Freddy some time after he had joined the trio, a relationship that lead to their eventual marriage in May 2016.

Jane Tucker appeared on The Justin Lee Collins Show on ITV2 on 19 March 2009. She was in the part of the show called 'A Blast From The Past' and also appeared at the end of the show dancing with Justin.

Freddy Marks died on 27 May 2021.

References

External links
 Rod, Jane and Freddy at the Internet Movie Database
Rod, Jane and Freddy Official Fan Page 
 Rod, Jane and Freddy Unofficial Facebook Fan Page
 Rod, Jane and Freddy Biography
 Rod, Jane and Freddy Songs
 Official Episode List
 Rod, Jane and Freddy Mini Website
 British Film Institute Screen Online Episode List

ITV children's television shows
British television shows featuring puppetry
British television spin-offs
Internet memes
1980s British children's television series
1990s British children's television series
1981 British television series debuts
1991 British television series endings
Television series by FremantleMedia Kids & Family
English-language television shows
Television shows produced by Thames Television